The Central Bureau of Statistics is the central agency for the collection, consolidation, processing, analysis, publication and dissemination of statistics in Nepal. One of its core tasks is to research and publish censuses of Nepal, the most prominent one being the overall population census and Demographics of Nepal.

History
The Central Bureau of Statistics was established in 1959 under the National Planning Commission of Nepal, which is headed by the Prime Minister of Nepal. Before 2015, different Nepalese governmental organisations gathered statistical information on their own. This led to inconsistencies in statistical information, for which the Bureau called for improvement of the processes, which, however, were not implemented as of 2017.

The Bureau's main functions include providing its government with statistics to help with public policy planning, collecting and analyzing socioeconomic data, and developing methodologies for reliable data collection and implementation.

After the April 2015 Nepal earthquake, the Bureau, in coordination with the United Nations, collected data regarding the damages in order for the Government of Nepal to support and compensate the victims.

References

Government agencies of Nepal
Nepal
1959 establishments in Nepal